This is a list of libraries in the Palestinian territories.

Libraries in the Palestinian territories 

 Al-Budeiri Library
 Al-Quds University Library
 An-Najah University Library
 Beth University Library
 Bethlehem Public Library
 Hebron University Library
 Islamic University Library
 Issaf Nashashibi Center for Culture and Literature
 Khalidi Library
 Nablus Library
 Palestine Polytechnic University Library

See also 

 List of museums in the State of Palestine

External links 

 Libraries in Palestine

 
Palestine
Lists of buildings and structures in the State of Palestine
Palestine (region)-related lists
Libraries